The Sawmill Fire was a wildfire that burned  in the U.S. state of Arizona in April 2017. The fire was caused by the detonation of a target packed with Tannerite at a gender reveal party in the Coronado National Forest. No injuries or fatalities resulted from the fire, nor were any buildings destroyed, though the fire did come close to the historic Empire Ranch, a National Register of Historic Places property. Over 800 personnel from various federal, state, and local agencies and organizations worked to contain and then extinguish the Sawmill Fire at a cost of $8,200,000.

The fire was started by accident on April 23, 2017, by Dennis Dickey, an off-duty U.S. Border Patrol agent who had shot the Tannerite target. Dickey immediately informed first responders of the fire, which spread rapidly until it was contained on April 30. The U.S. Attorney's Office charged Dickey with a misdemeanor charge to which he pleaded guilty, fined him $220,000 in restitution, and sentenced him to five years' probation. When the U.S. Forest Service released footage of the fire's inception in November 2018 at the request of a local news agency, the concept and practice of gender reveal parties became the subject of widespread ridicule and online mockery, a pattern repeated after later wildfires started at such events.

Background
Wildfires are a natural part of the ecological cycle of the Southwestern United States. The Sawmill Fire was one of 2,321 wildfires that burned  in Arizona in 2017. The State of Arizona expected a "normal" season but one with high fire potential in the state's southern grasslands because of high temperatures, low humidity, and an abundance of fuels. By August 2017, wildfires had burned the most amount of land since the 2011 season. In May 2018, the Ecological Restoration Institute at Northern Arizona University published a study of the 2017 wildfire season in Arizona and New Mexico and observed that more land had burned in Arizona than the average of the previous ten years. Eleven fires were studied, of which ten were in Arizona and included the Sawmill Fire.

Cause
The cause of the fire was a detonation at a gender reveal party hosted by the Dickey family of a target packed with blue dye to indicate the male gender of their child, and Tannerite, a highly explosive substance, by Dennis Dickey, an off-duty U.S. Border Patrol agent and the child's father. Dickey fired at the target four times, striking and detonating it with the fourth shot; the explosion immediately set the nearby grass on fire. According to his attorney, Dickey attempted to put out the fire but was unsuccessful because of the speed at which it was spreading. Afterward, Dickey alerted law enforcement and admitted culpability for the fire, and subsequently cooperated with authorities.

Fire
Firefighters began to attempt suppression of the fire, which was difficult in the rough terrain of the Santa Rita Mountains. That night, the fire crossed and damaged Arizona State Route 83, which runs south through the Coronado National Forest and had been closed earlier that day, and headed east across the Santa Rita Mountains.

As the fire continued to spread, about 100 area residents were evacuated and 100 others east of Route 83 received pre-evacuation notices. The local chapter of the American Red Cross opened two shelters in Sonoita and Tucson on April 24 and 25, but they were almost totally unused and were closed on April 29. By April 25, 363 first responders were fighting the Sawmill Fire, which had grown to  because of continued low humidity and high winds that made aerial firefighting impossible. Arizona State Route 83 and Interstate 10 were closed on April 27.

By 11:00am (MST) April 27, the Sawmill Fire had burned , and efforts to suppress it had by then cost $1,000,000 ($, adjusted for inflation). About 800 firefighters were present and made progress containing the fire with firebreaks on April 28 and 29, despite aircraft again being grounded by the wind. Route 83 was reopened and evacuation orders for people to its west were lifted on April 27. The firefighters were demobilized on May 1.

Aftermath
The Sawmill Fire burned  over 11 days, growing to its greatest extent on April 29, and cost $8,200,000 ($, adjusted for inflation) to suppress. Of the total area burned, about a third of it suffered total foliage mortality, concentrated in the west. 412 people were evacuated, but there were no fatalities, serious injuries, or buildings destroyed. After repairs to Route 83, it reopened in early May 2017.

Legal action against Dickey
The investigation and prosecution of the Sawmill Fire were turned over to the U.S. Attorney's Office in August 2017 as, though the fire started on the property of the State of Arizona, federal property had been burned. On September 20, 2018, Dickey was charged with starting a fire without a permit, a misdemeanor offense, and was summoned to appear at the United States District Court for the District of Arizona on September 29. He pleaded guilty to the charge, saying that the fire was an accident and that April 23, 2017, was "one of the worst days of [his] life". On October 9, 2018, Dickey was sentenced to five years' probation and agreed to pay the cost of the fire in restitution. This was reduced to $220,000 by a federal court in October 2018. Dickey also agreed to appear in a public service announcement for the USFS regarding the fire.

In July 2017, lawmakers in Pima County proposed the ban of the possession, creation, and distribution of explosive targets in response to the Sawmill Fire and other fires caused by exploding targets. Footage of Dickey shooting the target became public when, in November 2018, the Arizona Daily Star acquired it via a Freedom of Information Act request. The video brought the fire back into the public consciousness, resulting in both the party itself and the concept of gender reveal parties being mocked online. The Sawmill Fire was the first wildfire known to be ignited by a gender reveal party, but was not the last, as it was followed in 2020 by the El Dorado Fire in California, which sparked more public outrage.

References

Wildfires in Pima County, Arizona
2017 Arizona wildfires
History of Pima County, Arizona
April 2017 events in the United States